Zawda  is a village in the administrative district of Gmina Łasin, within Grudziądz County, Kuyavian-Pomeranian Voivodeship, in north-central Poland.

Notable residents
 Botho von Frantzius (1898-1942), general

References

Zawda